Gellonia is a genus of moths in the family Geometridae erected by Edward Meyrick in 1884.

Species
Gellonia dejectaria Walker, 1860
Gellonia pannularia Guenée, 1868

References

Ennominae